__NoTOC__

The Dong Feng-26 (DF-26) is an intermediate-range ballistic missile deployed by the People's Liberation Army Rocket Force and produced by the China Aerospace Science and Technology Corporation (CASC).

It is China's first conventionally-armed ballistic missile claimed to be capable of reaching Guam and the American military installations located there; this has led to the missile being referred to as the "Guam Express" or "Guam Killer".

The possibility that a DF-26 unit could have nuclear warheads makes it likely an adversary would target these missiles in a first strike.

The missile was officially revealed at the Chinese 2015 parade commemorating the end of the Second World War. In April 2018, it was officially confirmed that the DF-26 was in service with the People's Liberation Army Rocket Force (PLARF). The United States believes the missile was first fielded in 2016, with 16 operational launchers in 2017.

Tests and deployments
On 26 August 2020, along with a DF-21D, a DF-26B was launched into an area of the South China Sea between Hainan and the Paracel Islands, one day after China said that an American U-2 spy plane entered a no-fly zone without its permission during a Chinese live-fire naval drill in the Bohai Sea off its north coast (the US confirmed a U-2 sortie but denied it was improper.) and came as Washington blacklisted 24 Chinese companies and targeted individuals it said were part of construction and military activities in the South China Sea. US officials subsequently claimed that the People's Liberation Army Rocket Force (PLARF) had fired four medium-range ballistic missiles in total. The missile tests drew criticism from Japan, the Pentagon and Taiwan and led to volatility in Asian markets. As of 2019, the DF-26 has not been tested against targets at sea.

Variants
DF-26
DF-26B

See also
 Agni-IV
 DF-21
 RSD-10 Pioneer

Notes and references

Citations

General bibliography 

 
 

Ballistic missiles of the People's Republic of China
Intermediate-range ballistic missiles
Nuclear missiles of the People's Republic of China
Synthetic aperture radar
Military equipment introduced in the 2010s